"Show and Tell" is a popular song written by Jerry Fuller and first recorded by Johnny Mathis in 1972.  This original version made it to #36 on the Easy Listening chart.

Al Wilson version
A 1973 recording of the song by Al Wilson reached #1 on the Billboard Hot 100 for one week on January 19, 1974; it sold over two million copies and was named a Cash Box #1 Single of the Year. Billboard ranked it as the #15 song for 1974. Wilson's version also made #10 on the Hot Soul Singles chart.

Chart history

Weekly charts

Year-end charts

Other cover versions
Engelbert Humperdinck in 1974 on his album My Love.
Peabo Bryson had a #1 R&B hit with it in 1989. Bryson's rendition did not chart on the Hot 100.
American singer/actress Vanessa Williams for her 2005 studio album Everlasting Love.

In popular culture
The song was often played by Paul Shaffer and The CBS Orchestra on the Late Show with David Letterman for the segment "Show & Tell".
Wilson's version can be heard on TV show Malcolm in the Middle's episode "Forbidden Girlfriend".

References

External links
 Lyrics of this song
 

1972 songs
1973 singles
1989 singles
Johnny Mathis songs
Al Wilson (singer) songs
Peabo Bryson songs
Billboard Hot 100 number-one singles
Cashbox number-one singles
Songs written by Jerry Fuller
1970s ballads